The School of Pythagoras is the oldest building in St John's College, Cambridge, and the oldest secular building in Cambridge, England. It is a Grade 1 listed building.

The School of Pythagoras was originally built around 1200, before even the University of Cambridge existed. It also predates St John's College, which was founded in 1511. It was initially a private house, but over the centuries it has had many uses. For a period it was a ruin. The reason for the name is unclear.

In the 16th century, a small manor house was added to its west side. This is known as Merton Hall. It is now used for graduate student accommodation. From 1266 until 1959 the School of Pythagoras and later Merton Hall were owned by Merton College, Oxford.

The School of Pythagoras is now used as the College Archive Centre. To the north is Northampton Street.

See also 
 St Bene't's Church, the oldest building in Cambridge, dating from 1033
 Leper Chapel, dating from 1125
 Holy Sepulchre, Cambridge or Round Church, dating from 1130

References 

1200 establishments in England
St John's College, Cambridge
Merton College, Oxford
Theatres in Cambridge
Grade I listed buildings in Cambridge